Saint Colluthus is a Coptic saint and martyr of the 3rd century AD said to be from Antinoöpolis.

According to his Hagiography, Colluthus' father was the governor of the Upper Egyptian city of Ansena. His parents were both Christians. He lived a celibate, although his sister was married to Arianus, who became Ansena's governor after the departure of Colluthus' father.

Colluthus was a physician who did not charge money for his services. When Roman emperor Diocletian began his persecutions of Christians, Arianus apostatized in order to keep his position as a governor. When Colluthus rebuked Arianus for persecuting the Christians, Arianus sent him to the governor of Oxyrhynchus who threw him in prison for three years. Colluthus' sister unsuccessfully mediated for his release. After three years, a different governor of Oxyrhynchus took Colluthus out of prison, tortured him, and eventually cut his head off on 25 Pashons. 

The emperor Galerius ended the Diocletianic Persecution with the Edict of Serdica in 311. After Christianity was declared one of the Empire's legal religions by the emperor Constantine I, a church was built for Saint Colluthus, where his relics were placed.

Sources
Coptic Synexarion

Saints from Roman Egypt
3rd-century deaths
3rd-century Christian martyrs
Year of birth unknown
Christians martyred during the reign of Diocletian